Simanga Dlamini (born 8 October 1997) is a Swazi swimmer. He competed in the 2020 Summer Olympics.

References

External links
 

1997 births
Living people
Swimmers at the 2020 Summer Olympics
Swazi male swimmers
Olympic swimmers of Eswatini
Swimmers at the 2022 Commonwealth Games
Commonwealth Games competitors for Eswatini